The Incredible Hulk: Original Soundtrack Recording is the licensed promotional soundtrack from the 1970s/1980s television series adaptation of The Incredible Hulk.

Album information 
This contains compositions by the series composer Joe Harnell which includes suites and compositions from the pilot film and from episodes "Married", "Homecoming", "Prometheus", and "Ricky", with some music that also appeared in the Cliffhangers segments "Stop Susan Williams" and "The Secret Empire".

Track listing

Reception 

The soundtrack received mixed reviews from critics in the music community. Christopher Coleman of TrackSounds gave it a 5 out of 10, citing the opening theme, "Homecoming: Suite", and "The Lonely Man" as unforgettable, while also stating that many of the other tracks are typical seventies fare that could easily fit into any other popular series of that time. Christian Clemmensen of Filmtracks felt that the score had aged badly giving the example of Harnell's work on V, and citing the elements, the seventies pop influence, don't really hold up after thirty years. Andreas Lindahl of ScoreReviews cited some cues as exciting and memorable, but felt the sound was far too small with a feeling that the action music was played by "a tiny chamber music ensemble."

References 

Television soundtracks
1999 soundtrack albums
The Incredible Hulk (1978 TV series)